Vea is a former Puerto Rican celebrity gossip magazine form 1968 until 2009. 

Vea or VEA may also refer to:

People
 Alfredo Véa Jr. (born 1950), a Mexican-Yaqui-Filipino-American lawyer and novelist
 Atelea Vea, an Australian-Tongan professional rugby league footballer
 Carmen Valle Vea (born 1979), a Mexican politician
 Dominic Vea (born 1981), an Australian professional cruiser/heavyweight boxer
 Erik Vea (born 1951), a Norwegian speedskater
 Ketil Vea (1932–2015), a Norwegian composer and pedagogue
 Soakai Vea, a Tongan footballer
 Taione Vea (born 1988), a former Tonga rugby union player
 Vita Vea (born 1995), an American football defensive tackle
 Wilford Vea (born 1992), a Tongan weightlifter
 Jay Washington, (born Anthony Jay Washington Vea, 1981), a Filipino-American professional basketball player

Other
 Veteran's Entitlement Act, an Australian law in Veterans' Review Board
 Virtual Education Academy, in CyberExtension
 Plaza Vea, the largest chain of supermarkets and hypermarket from Supermercados Peruanos S.A in Peru
 Diario VEA, a daily newspaper in Venezuela
 Volvo Engine Architecture, an engine family made by Volvo Cars
 Vlaams Energieagentschap, the Flemish Energy Agency

See also

 Vay (disambiguation)
 Vey (disambiguation)